Thiago Rockenbach da Silva (born 1 February 1985) is a Brazilian former professional footballer who played as a midfielder.

Career
In 2002 Thiago Rockenbach moved to Germany to join Werder Bremen. During his time there he played for the club's reserves while also training with the first team a few times. He joined Rot-Weiß Erfurt in 2007.

References

External links
 

1985 births
Living people
Association football midfielders
Brazilian footballers
FC Rot-Weiß Erfurt players
SV Werder Bremen II players
Fortuna Düsseldorf players
RB Leipzig players
Hertha BSC II players
Berliner FC Dynamo players
Tennis Borussia Berlin players
Brandenburger SC Süd 05 players
2. Bundesliga players
3. Liga players
Regionalliga players
NOFV-Oberliga players
Brazilian expatriate footballers
Brazilian expatriate sportspeople in Germany
Expatriate footballers in Germany